The Lenovo Vibe Z2 Pro is an Android smartphone released in 2014. Support install LineageOS 19.

Design and performance
The Vibe Z2 Pro has a 6-inch, 2560-by-1440 pixel display. It has a Snapdragon 801 processor, 3 gigabytes of RAM, and 32 gigabytes of storage. It has a 16-megapixel rear camera with optical image stabilization, a dual LED flash, the ability to record 4K video, scene auto-detection, high dynamic range, and a low-light mode for night use. The battery has a capacity of 4,000 mAh. It has two micro-SIM slots. It has metallic unibody chassis with a metallic finish. The device measures 156 by 81.2 by 7.7 millimeters and weighs 176 grams.

The Vibe Z2 Pro runs Google's Android 4.4 "KitKat" operating system with  Lenovo's Vibe 2.0 user interface. It will also come with apps such as SHAREit, for wireless content sharing, SYNCit, for data backups via cloud, and SEEit, for photo management, pre-installed.

Key specifications
5 MP Secondary Camera
Android v4.4 (KitKat) OS
16 MP Primary Camera
Wi-Fi Enabled
6-inch Capacitive Touchscreen
2.5 GHz Qualcomm Snapdragon 801 MSM8974AC Quad
Core Processor

General features
Brand - Lenovo
SIM Size - Micro SIM
Call Features - Loudspeaker
Touch Screen - Yes, Capacitive
SIM Type Dual Sim - GSM + GSM
Model ID - Vibe Z2 Pro

Display
Resolution Quad HD, 2560 X 1440 Pixels
Other Display
Features - Gorilla Glass 3
Size - 6 Inches

Reviews
The Deccan Chronicle stated, "When Lenovo asked its bunch of product development experts in Japan, China and the US, to create a flagship smartphone of its VIBE series, they were given a free hand without having to bother about a production budget. The product team  delivered a monster of a phone, and it seems many in the team are professional photographers, or are at least interested in something more than selfies with multiple background options."

References

Mobile phones introduced in 2014
Android (operating system) devices
Vibe Z2 Pro
Mobile phones with 4K video recording
Discontinued smartphones